The Wrong Boy, published in 2000, is playwright Willy Russell’s first novel.<ref>[http://www.allmusic.com/artist/willy-russell-mn0000676474 Willy Russell"] allmusic.com, accessed September 20, 2016</ref>

Russell is mainly known for his plays Educating Rita and Shirley Valentine which have both been made into films, and Blood Brothers, a musical.The Wrong Boy, like Educating Rita & Our Day Out'', is about education; this time about a teenage boy who falls foul of the British educational system, and how he eventually ‘makes good’.

References

2000 British novels
2000 debut novels
Doubleday (publisher) books